This is a list of State Protected Monument in India, as officially reported by and available through the website of the Archaeological Survey of India in the Indian state Karnataka. The monument identifier is a combination of the abbreviation of the subdivision of the list (state, ASI circle) and the numbering as published on the website of the ASI. 747 State Protected Monuments have been recognized by the ASI in Karnataka. Besides the State Protected Monuments, also the Monuments of National Importance in this state might be relevant.

List of state protected monuments 

 
| 

|}

See also
 List of Monuments of National Importance in Karnataka
 List of State Protected Monuments in India

References 

Karnataka
State Protected Monuments
State Protected Monuments
State Protected Monuments